Pierre-André Périssol (born 30 April 1947) is a French politician, former Minister of Housing, and former Deputy in the National Assembly of France. Périssol is currently serving his third term as the mayor of Moulins, Allier.

In June 2010 Périssol was named president of the French Development Agency.

References

External links
 Personal website

1947 births
Living people
The Republicans (France) politicians
Union for a Popular Movement politicians
Deputies of the 12th National Assembly of the French Fifth Republic
People from Nice
Mayors of places in Auvergne-Rhône-Alpes
École Polytechnique alumni
Government ministers of France